Afrothismia insignis is a member of the genus Afrothismia. It is endemic to Tanzania. The species is vulnerable due to habitat loss and potential future threats.

References

Burmanniaceae
Plants described in 1988
Endemic flora of Tanzania